Maleli Kunavore (13 November 1983 – 15 November 2012) was a Fijian rugby union footballer.

Career

He played as a centre, wing or fullback. He played for Toulouse in the Top 14 and Heineken Cup. He was found by Fiji coach Wayne Pivac when he spotted Maleli playing in the Colonial Cup for the Coastal Stallions. He was selected for the national team for the Pacific 5 Nations tournament. After a game against Japan he and a few other players were caught in a brawl and were suspended from playing any games in and for Fiji until 31 December 2006.

A product of the Nadi Muslim Academy, Kunavore began to shine when he represented the Fiji U21 side in 2004. A year later the solid speedster was the top try scorer for the Stallions in the Colonial Cup. He improved with every match and scored one try and two conversions to help his province Nadroga with the Fiji Cup final in 2005. He then earned his first Test cap and also scored a try to help Fiji defeat Samoa 21-15 in Suva. In mid-2005 he left Fiji's shores for a position at Toulouse in France.

In early 2010, Kunavore suffered two major injuries to his left arm. He underwent a cardiac operation. He left Toulouse and retired from rugby soon after.

On 15 November 2012, he suffered a cardiac arrest and he died at his home in Suva. He was 29 years of age.

References

External links
 Toulouse profile
 Scrum profile
 Fiji profile

1983 births
2012 deaths
Fijian rugby union players
People from Sigatoka
Stade Toulousain players
Rugby union centres
Rugby union wings
Expatriate rugby union players in France
Fiji international rugby union players
Fijian expatriate rugby union players
Fijian expatriate sportspeople in France
I-Taukei Fijian people